Manabendra Bandyopadhyay (1938–2020) was an Indian writer and translator, best known for his translations of Latin American literature and world poetry into the Bengali language. He was born in 1938 in Sylhet (in modern Bangladesh) and studied comparative literature at Jadavpur University under the tutelage of Buddhadev Bose. He later taught at Jadavpur. 

He died from COVID-19 complications in 2020. 

He is survived by his daughter, Kaushalya Bannerji.

Among the many authors he translated into Bengali are: 
 Gabriel Garcia Marquez
 Juan Rulfo
 Alejo Carpentier
 Nicanor Parra
 Jules Verne
 Aime Cesaire
 Hans Magnus Enzensberger
 Stanislav Lem
 Edward Lear
 Arthur Conan Doyle
 La Fontaine
 Edward Bond
 Charles Perrault
 Miroslav Holub
 Edgar Allan Poe
 Czeslaw Milosz

References

1938 births
2020 deaths
Indian male writers
Indian translators
Recipients of the Sahitya Akademi Prize for Translation
Writers from Kolkata
Deaths from the COVID-19 pandemic in India